There are several works with the title Dragon Quest or a similar title:

Dragon Quest, a series of video games
Dragon Quest (video game), the first game in the series, originally known as Dragon Warrior in North America
Dragon Quest (TV series), also known as Dragon Warrior, a 1989 Japanese anime based on the video game series
Dragon Quest (manga series), a Japanese manga based on the video game series
Dragon Quest, an episode of the 2010 Canadian-American animated TV series My Little Pony: Friendship is Magic
DragonQuest, a fantasy role-playing game
Dragonquest, a 1970 fantasy novel by Anne McCaffrey